Ponor is a commune located in Alba County, Transylvania, Romania. It is composed of six villages: După Deal, Geogel (Kisgyógypatak), Măcărești, Ponor, Vale în Jos, and Valea Bucurului.

The commune lies on the banks of the river Cheia. It is situated in the southeastern reaches of the Apuseni Mountains, within the Trascău Mountains.

At the 2011 census, Ponor had a population of 540; of those, 96.3% were ethnic Romanians.

Natives
Victor Ciorbea (b. 1954), politician, Mayor of Bucharest and Prime Minister of Romania

References

Communes in Alba County
Localities in Transylvania